Edward McMillan Little (4 November 1864 – 1 July 1945) was a Scottish-born South African international rugby union player.

Biography
Born in Midlothian, he first played provincial rugby for Griqualand West (now known as the Griquas), before joining Western Province.

He made his only two Test appearances for South Africa during Great Britain's 1891 tour. Alexander was selected to play as a forward in the 1st and 3rd matches of the series, both of which South Africa lost. Little died in 1945 at the age of 80.

Test history

See also
List of South Africa national rugby union players – Springbok no. 12

References

1864 births
1945 deaths
Place of death missing
Rugby union forwards
Rugby union players from Midlothian
Scottish emigrants to South Africa
South Africa international rugby union players
Griquas (rugby union) players
Western Province (rugby union) players